Low-rank matrix approximations are essential tools in the application of kernel methods to large-scale learning problems.

Kernel methods (for instance, support vector machines or Gaussian processes) project data points into a high-dimensional or infinite-dimensional feature space and find the optimal splitting hyperplane. In the kernel method the data is represented in a kernel matrix (or, Gram matrix). Many algorithms can solve machine learning problems using the kernel matrix. The main problem of kernel method is its high computational cost associated with kernel matrices. The cost is at least quadratic in the number of training data points, but most kernel methods include computation of matrix inversion or eigenvalue decomposition and the cost becomes cubic in the number of training data. Large training sets cause large storage and computational costs. Despite low rank decomposition methods (Cholesky decomposition) reduce this cost, they continue to require computing the kernel matrix.  One of the approaches to deal with this problem is low-rank matrix approximations. The most popular examples of them are Nyström method and the random features. Both of them have been successfully applied to efficient kernel learning.

Nyström approximation 
Kernel methods become unfeasible when the number of points  is so large such that the kernel matrix  cannot be stored in memory.

The Nyström approximation can allow a significant speed-up of the computations. This speed-up is achieved by using, instead of the kernel matrix, its approximation  of rank . An advantage of the method is that it is not necessary to compute or store the whole kernel matrix, but only a submatrix of size .

The method is named "Nyström approximation" because it can be interpreted as a case of the Nyström method from integral equation theory.

Theorem for kernel approximation 
 is a kernel matrix for some kernel method. Consider the first  points in the training set. Then there exists a matrix  of rank :

 , where

 ,

 is invertible matrix

and

Proof

Singular-value decomposition application 

then the matrix  can be rewritten as:

Further proof 
  is  data matrix
 
 

Applying singular-value decomposition to these matrices:

  is the -dimensional matrix consisting of the first  rows of matrix 
 
 
Applying singular-value decomposition to these matrices:

Since  are orthogonal matrices,

 (  is not necessarily an orthogonal matrix).

However, defining , it can be computed the next way:

By the characterization for orthogonal matrix :  equality  holds.

Then the expression for :

Defining , the proof is finished.

General theorem for kernel approximation for a feature map 
Once again, a simple inspection shows that the feature map is only needed in the proof while the end result only depends on computing the kernel function.

Application for regularized least squares 
In a vector and kernel notation, the problem of Regularized least squares can be rewritten as:

Computing the gradient and setting in to 0, the minimum can be obtained:

The inverse matrix  can be computed using Woodbury matrix identity:

It has the desired storage and complexity requirements.

Randomized feature maps approximation 
Let  – samples of data,  – a randomized feature map (maps a single vector to a vector of higher dimensionality) so that the inner product between a pair of transformed points approximates their kernel evaluation:

where  is the mapping embedded in the RBF kernel.

There are different randomized feature maps to compute the approximations to the RBF kernels. For instance, Random Fourier features and random binning features.

Random Fourier features 
Random Fourier features map produces a Monte Carlo approximation to the feature map. The Monte Carlo method is considered to be randomized. The line is randomly chosen, then the data points are projected on it by the mappings. The resulting scalar is passed through a sinusoid. The product of the transformed points will approximate a shift-invariant kernel. Since the map is smooth, random Fourier features work well on interpolation tasks.

Random binning features 
A random binning features map partitions the input space using randomly shifted grids at randomly chosen resolutions and assigns to an input point a binary bit string that corresponds to the bins in which it falls. Since this mapping is not smooth and uses the proximity between input points, Random Binning Features works well for approximating kernels that depend only on the  distance between datapoints.

Comparison of approximation methods 
The approaches for large-scale kernel learning (Nyström method and random features) differs in the fact that the Nyström method uses data dependent basis functions while in random features approach the basis functions are sampled from a distribution independent from the training data. This difference leads to an improved analysis for kernel learning approaches based on the Nyström method. When there is a large gap in the eigen-spectrum of the kernel matrix, approaches based on the Nyström method can achieve better results than Random Features based approach.

See also
 Nyström method
 Support vector machine
 Radial basis function kernel
 Regularized least squares

External links 
 Andreas Müller (2012). Kernel Approximations for Efficient SVMs (and other feature extraction methods).

References

Kernel methods for machine learning